An Act against the bringing in and putting in execution of bulls writings or instruments and other superstitious things from the See of Rome, also known as Bulls, etc., from Rome Act 1571, (13 Eliz. 1, c. 2) was an Act of the Parliament of England during the English Reformation. The Act punished with high treason those who published papal bulls and Roman Catholic priests and their converts. This Act was a response to Pope Pius V's Regnans in Excelsis.

Breaching the Act ceased to be a crime in 1846, but remained unlawful until the Act was repealed. The remainder of the Act was repealed by the Statute Law (Repeals) Act 1969.

In 1911, Pope Pius X excommunicated Arnold Mathew from the Catholic Church. The Times reported on this excommunication and included an English language translation of the Latin language document which described Mathew, among other things, as a "pseudo-bishop". Mathew's attorney argued, in the 1913 trial Mathew v. "The Times" Publishing Co., Ltd., that publication of the excommunication by The Times in English was high treason under this law. The trial was, according to a 1932 article in The Tablet, the last time this principle was invoked and the judge, Charles Darling, 1st Baron Darling, "held that it was not unlawful to publish a Papal Bull in a newspaper simply for the information of the public."

Notes

External links
Text of the Act, Danby Pickering, The Statutes at Large, 1763, vol. 6, pp. 257 (from Google Book Search)

Acts of the Parliament of England concerning religion
1571 in law
1571 in England
Papal bulls